The 2018 Kent State Golden Flashes football team represented Kent State University in the 2018 NCAA Division I FBS football season. They were led by first-year head coach Sean Lewis and played their home games at Dix Stadium in Kent, Ohio as members of the East Division of the Mid-American Conference. They finished the season 2–10, 1–7 in MAC play to finish in last place in the East Division.

Previous season
The Golden Flashes finished the 2017 season 2–10, 1–7 in MAC play to finish in last place in the East Division.

On August 28, 2017, the school announced that head coach Paul Haynes would be taking a medical leave of absence and miss the first two to three weeks of the season. Offensive coordinator Don Treadwell was named interim head coach. Haynes returned to the Flashes after missing two games due to prostate cancer treatments.

On November 22, one day after the Flashes' final game of the season against Akron, the school fired Paul Haynes after five losing seasons. On December 19, the school hired Sean Lewis as head coach.

Preseason

Award watch lists
Listed in the order that they were released

Preseason media poll
The MAC released their preseason media poll on July 24, 2018, with the Golden Flashes predicted to finish in last place in the East Division.

Roster

Schedule

Source:

Game summaries

at Illinois

Howard

at Penn State

at Ole Miss

at Ball State

Ohio

at Miami (OH)

Akron

at Bowling Green

at Buffalo

Toledo

Eastern Michigan

References

Kent State
Kent State Golden Flashes football seasons
Kent State Golden Flashes football